Edward Irenaeus Prime-Stevenson (January 29, 1858 – July 23, 1942) was an American author.  He used the pseudonym Xavier Mayne.

Biography
His father, Paul E. Stevenson, was a Presbyterian minister and a school principal; his mother, Cornelia, came from the Prime family of distinguished literary and academic figures.

After studying law, Stevenson decided to become a writer and a journalist. In 1901 he moved to Europe, living in Florence and Lausanne, where he died of a heart attack in 1942.

In 1896 Stevenson published The Square of Sevens, and the Parallelogram: An Authoritative Method of Cartomancy with a Prefatory Note by Robert Antrobus that was supposedly written in 1735. However, it is believed that he was the author.

In 1906, under the pseudonym Xavier Mayne, Stevenson published the homosexually themed novel Imre: A Memorandum, and in 1908 a sexology study, The Intersexes, a defense of homosexuality from a scientific, legal, historical, and personal perspective.

Quotes

Bibliography

References

External links

 
 
 
 Left to Themselves: Being the Ordeal of Philip and Gerald (Scanned copy of the novel)

1858 births
1942 deaths
20th-century American novelists
American male novelists
American gay writers
LGBT people from New Jersey
People from Madison, New Jersey
Novelists from New Jersey
American LGBT novelists
20th-century American male writers